Proxima Midnight is a fictional supervillain appearing in American comic books published by Marvel Comics. She is a prominent member of the Black Order, a team of aliens who work for Thanos. Created by writer Jonathan Hickman, she first appeared in New Avengers #8 (Sept. 2013).

The character has made several appearances in media, such as animated television series, the Marvel Cinematic Universe films Avengers: Infinity War and Avengers: Endgame with Carrie Coon voicing the role, and video games. Coon returned to voice an alternate timeline version of the character in the Disney+ animated series What If...? (2021).

Publication history
Proxima Midnight was created by writer Jonathan Hickman, and first appeared in one panel in New Avengers #8 (September 2013). She later made a more substantial appearance later that month in Infinity #1 (October 2013), which also featured the first appearance of the Black Order.

Fictional character biography
Proxima Midnight is a member of Thanos' Black Order. Thanos chose her for her expert combatant skills. Proxima is the wife of fellow Order member Corvus Glaive. She was sent to Earth to retrieve an Infinity Gem from Namor, but came into contact with the New Avengers. She battled Spectrum and Luke Cage where she found herself evenly matched. She was humiliated by Thanos' disapproval of her actions as well as the fact that Namor did not actually possess the Gem. Proxima and the rest of the Order were directed by Namor to Wakanda to search for the Gem, but were distracted when Ebony Maw revealed the location of Thane, Thanos' son. Thane wanted nothing to do with his father and imprisoned him and Proxima in amber where they were taken to Necropolis.

Namor freed Proxima, as well as Thanos, and asked that they join his Cabal due to his own anger towards Earth. However, Namor soon found himself hating the Cabal's tactics and vowed to work with the Illuminati to defeat them. Namor himself was betrayed and found himself and the Cabal stuck on an earth that was to be destroyed. They all managed to escape into the Ultimate Marvel Universe and vowed to get their revenge. They crafted a "life raft" and managed to live past the destruction of all universes. The Cabal ended up on Battleworld where they proceeded to attack the locals. However, God Emperor Doom dispersed the group to the various corners of Battleworld and Proxima, along with Corvus Glaive, were imprisoned by Apocalypse.

She managed to return to her own home when the Mainstream Marvel Universe was rebuilt. She met up with Thanos and a cloaked figure, later revealed to be Hela, and teamed up with her to retrieve Mjolnir. Their quest would lead them into battling Thor, Beta Ray Bill, The Collector and others. Ultimately, Proxima and Hela were humiliated and forced to return empty handed. To prove herself worthy, Hela killed Proxima in front of Thanos, adding one last humiliation for her.

During the "No Surrender" arc Challenger revived Proxima Midnight when the Black Order was reformed with Black Swan, Ebony Maw, a psychic projection of Supergiant, and a revived Black Dwarf and Corvus Glaive. The group competed with an alien version of the Lethal Legion formed by Grandmaster in a contest where Earth is the battlefield.

Powers and abilities
Proxima possessed the typical attributes of a super powered individual including superhuman strength, speed, endurance and durability. Being able to survive planetary reentry without injury, she was also a master combatant and owned a spear created from a star trapped in a quantum singularity by Thanos himself.

The spear is capable of drastic harm based on how it is thrown and who it is used against, becoming a multi-pronged lance of poisonous energy that follows their target, never missing. Said force was fatal to whomever it pierced, killing the victim in minutes. It could revert to star form, gaining infinite mass which weighed down prey in an energy entanglement. This effect could even bind and revert an enraged Hulk back to Bruce Banner upon removal.

In other media

Television
 Proxima Midnight appears in Avengers Assemble, voiced by Kari Wahlgren. 
 Proxima Midnight appears in Guardians of the Galaxy, voiced again by Kari Wahlgren. While initially a member of the Black Order, she later becomes a member of the Universal Believers.

Marvel Cinematic Universe
Proxima Midnight appears in media set in the Marvel Cinematic Universe.
 Midnight is introduced in the live-action film Avengers: Infinity War, with Carrie Coon providing the character's voice and facial capture, while stuntwoman Monique Ganderton physically portrayed her through motion capture. Midnight and the Children of Thanos assist their father Thanos in finding the Infinity Stones. While attempting to claim the Mind Stone, she and her husband Corvus Glaive attack Wanda Maximoff and Vision, but are repelled by Steve Rogers, Natasha Romanoff, and Sam Wilson. During a second attempt, Midnight attempts to kill Maximoff, only to be stopped by Romanoff and Okoye before Maximoff kills Midnight.
 An alternate timeline version of Midnight appears in the live-action film Avengers: Endgame, with Ganderton reprising her role without Coon due to Midnight having no dialogue. She travels through time with Thanos to stop the Avengers from foiling Thanos' plans, only to be disintegrated after Tony Stark uses the Infinity Stones.
 An alternate timeline version of Midnight appears in the Disney+ animated series What If...? episode "What If... T'Challa Became a Star-Lord?"

Video games
 Proxima Midnight appeared as a mini-boss and a boss in Marvel Avengers Alliance.
 Proxima Midnight appears as a boss and unlockable playable character in Marvel Future Fight.
 Proxima Midnight appeared as a boss in Marvel Avengers Academy during the "Return of A-Force" event.
 Proxima Midnight appears as an unlockable playable character in Lego Marvel Super Heroes 2. She is available through the DLC "Marvel's Avengers: Infinity War Movie Level Pack".
 Proxima Midnight appears as a mini-boss and unlockable playable character in Marvel Contest of Champions.
 Proxima Midnight appears as a support character in Marvel Puzzle Quest.
 Proxima Midnight appeared as a playable character in Marvel End Time Arena.
 Proxima Midnight appears as a boss in Marvel Ultimate Alliance 3: The Black Order, voiced again by Kari Wahlgren.

References

External links
 Proxima Midnight at the Marvel Wiki

Characters created by Jonathan Hickman
Comics characters introduced in 2013
Female characters in film
Fictional characters with superhuman durability or invulnerability
Fictional polearm and spearfighters
Fictional women soldiers and warriors
Marvel Comics aliens
Marvel Comics characters who can move at superhuman speeds
Marvel Comics characters with superhuman strength
Marvel Comics extraterrestrial supervillains
Marvel Comics female supervillains
Marvel Comics film characters